Wence Madu is a Nigerian educationist and charismatic leader. He is the rector of Imo State Polytechnic.

References

External links
Wence Madu Profile on Imo State Polytechnic

People from Imo State
Nigerian educators
University of Nigeria alumni
Nnamdi Azikiwe University alumni
Living people
Year of birth missing (living people)